Petrova Ves is a village and municipality in Skalica District in the Trnava Region of western Slovakia.

History 
In historical records the village was first mentioned in 1392. However, the village was inhabited for a long time before. Archeological studies evidenced the existence of Celtic and Roman settlements.  Those were further replaced by the Slavs in the 9th century. In that time, the municipality and surroundings were part of the Great Moravia. At the end of the 11th century the village became part of the Hungarian Kingdom.

The name of the village comes from  Peter Varády, an important Hungarian aristocrat who came to the village in the year 1093. Therefore, the village was named Peterlak in Hungarian, Petrovilla in Latin and Petersdorf in German. Since the end of World War I, the former Czechoslovak state proclaimed the name Petrova Ves as the official name of the village.

Geography 
The municipality lies at an altitude of 207 metres and covers an area of 14.631 km².  It has a population of about 1003 people.

References

External links 

 http://www.petrovaves.sk

Villages and municipalities in Skalica District